Cartoon Cartoons is a collective name used by Cartoon Network for their original animated television series originally aired between 1995 and 2003 and produced in majority by Hanna-Barbera and/or Cartoon Network Studios. Beginning with its inception into cable broadcasting on October 1, 1992, Cartoon Network had focused its programming on reruns of older animated series which it had acquired through its parent company's film library. The Cartoon Cartoons label originated with Fred Seibert's animation anthology series What a Cartoon!, an animation showcase series featuring pilots of original cartoon ideas submitted by independent animators. Dexter's Laboratory was the first such pilot to be greenlit by the network for a full series in 1996. After other pilots were successfully produced into their own series, including Cow and Chicken, Johnny Bravo, and The Powerpuff Girls, the collective Cartoon Cartoons were featured on the network's Friday night programming block, Cartoon Cartoon Fridays from 1999 to 2003. Not all CN original series created around this time were officially recognized as Cartoon Cartoons; Samurai Jack, for example, did not bear the moniker.

The moniker was retired by the network in 2003, and its last surviving series, Ed, Edd n Eddy, ended on November 8, 2009, over 10 years after its premiere. Since their heyday, reruns of the Cartoon Cartoons continued to air on The Cartoon Cartoon Show (2005–2008) and Cartoon Planet (2012–2014). In 2021, the name was resurrected by the network for a new shorts program.

History 

Cartoon Cartoons first appeared as shorts on animation showcase series What a Cartoon! in 1995, under the name of World Premiere Toons. The series was produced by Hanna-Barbera and Cartoon Network Studios under the direction of Fred Seibert. Seibert had been a guiding force for Nickelodeon (having overseen the creation of Nicktoons shortly prior to his departure) prior to joining Hanna-Barbera and would establish Frederator Studios years later.

Through What a Cartoon!, Cartoon Network was able to assess the potential of certain shorts to serve as pilots for spin-off series and signed contracts with their creators to create ongoing series. Dexter's Laboratory was the most popular short series according to a vote held in 1995, and became the first Cartoon Cartoon in 1996. The network's previous original shows, The Moxy Show and Space Ghost Coast to Coast, as well as all acquired programming were not retroactively given the Cartoon Cartoons label. Three more series based on shorts debuted in 1997: Johnny Bravo, Cow and Chicken, and I Am Weasel (the latter two as segments of the same show; I Am Weasel was later spun off into a separate show). These are followed by The Powerpuff Girls in 1998 and Ed, Edd n Eddy in 1999, and concluded with Mike, Lu & Og and Courage the Cowardly Dog in 1999, creating a lineup of critically acclaimed shows. In 2001, the network received Time Squad and Grim & Evil (the previous state of Evil Con Carne and The Grim Adventures of Billy & Mandy). Also in 2001, the show Samurai Jack premiered, but was not officially branded as a Cartoon Cartoon despite airing during the various programming blocks. In 2002, Codename: Kids Next Door became a full series after being chosen in the previous year's Big Pick Weekend. It was also the last original series to officially carry the Cartoon Cartoon branding before being discontinued.

The Cartoon Cartoon brand was first introduced in July 1997 for the network's Cartoon Cartoon Weekend block. From 1999 to 2003, the Cartoon Cartoon Fridays block was the network's marquee night for premieres of new episodes and series.

The Cartoon Cartoons were intended to appeal to a wider audience than the average Saturday-morning cartoon. Linda Simensky, vice president of original animation, reminded adults and teenage girls that the cartoons could appeal to them as well. Kevin Sandler's article on them claimed that these cartoons were both less "bawdy" than their counterparts at Comedy Central and less "socially responsible" than their counterparts at Nickelodeon. Sandler pointed to the whimsical rebelliousness, high rate of exaggeration and self-consciousness of the overall output which each individual series managed.

In October 2003, the same month the new live-action Fridays premiered on the network and the Cartoon Cartoons brand was officially discontinued. Although the Cartoon Cartoon branding was dropped this year, the Cartoon Cartoons bumpers (that appeared before and after episodes of its original series) remained intact until the network's rebrand in June 2004. In November 2004, the block Cartoon Cartoons: The Top 5 was renamed to simply The Top 5. CN still kept the Cartoon Cartoons name around in various forms applying to their older series (such as for The Cartoon Cartoon Show from 2005 to 2008), but since newer shows such as Foster's Home for Imaginary Friends, Camp Lazlo, and Ben 10 were stylistically different from previous shows, the moniker was not applied to them.

However, internationally in places like Asia and Latin America, the moniker continued on until 2007 with shows like Foster's Home, Hi Hi Puffy AmiYumi, Camp Lazlo, and My Gym Partner's a Monkey.

Revival 
On April 15, 2021, Cartoon Network announced a new iteration of the Cartoon Cartoons shorts program. On November 24, 2021, the first new Cartoon Cartoons shorts completed production. The first nine shorts include Accordions Geoffery & Mary Melodica by Louie Zong (of The Ghost and Molly McGee and We Bare Bears), Dang! It's Dracula by Levon Jihanian (of Tig n' Seek), Hungy Ghost by Jesse Moynihan (of Adventure Time), Fruit Stand at the End of the World by Rachel Liu, Off the Menu by Shavonne Cherry (of Ren & Stimpy and The Looney Tunes Show), Harmony in Despair by Andrew Dickman (of Looney Tunes Cartoons), Unravel by Alexis Sugden, Mouthwash Madness by Lisa Vandenberg (of Animaniacs), and Scaredy Cat by JJ Villard (of King Star King). On June 7, 2022, More Cartoon Cartoons completed production. The next seven shorts include The All-Nimal by Nick Edwards (of Apple and Onion and The Fungies), Buttons' Gamezone by Fernando Puig (of The Cuphead Show and Tig n' Seek), Tib Tub, We Need You by Sean Godsey and Mike Rosenthal, I Love You Jocelyn by Tracey Laguerre (Art and Animation Director for brands like Google, Dreamworks, Buzzfeed and more) , Pig in a Wig by Sam Marin (of Regular Show), The Good Boy Report (based on the webcomic of the same name) by Kasey Williams (of Niko and the Sword of Light and Harley Quinn) and Maude Macher and Dom Duck by Kali Fontecchio (of The Looney Tunes Show and Jellystone!).

Programming blocks 
More shows premiered bearing the Cartoon Cartoons brand, airing throughout the network's schedule and prominently on Cartoon Cartoon Fridays, which became the marquee night for premieres of new episodes and shows beginning June 11, 1999. On October 3, 2003, the block was rebooted under a hybrid live-action format as Fridays, hosted by Tommy Snider and Nzinga Blake, the latter of whom was later replaced by Tara Sands. It aired shows outside the Cartoon Cartoon moniker, such as Foster's Home for Imaginary Friends, Hi Hi Puffy AmiYumi, The Life and Times of Juniper Lee, Camp Lazlo, My Gym Partner's a Monkey, Squirrel Boy, and Class of 3000. The last airing of Fridays was on February 23, 2007.

Cartoon Cartoons: The Top 5 (simply retitled The Top 5 in 2004), an hour-long program featuring a countdown of the week's five "best" Cartoon Cartoon episodes from the network's lineup, ran from 2002 to 2008. From 2005 to 2008, the Cartoon Cartoons label was primarily used for The Cartoon Cartoon Show, a half-hour program featuring episodes of older Cartoon Cartoons that were no longer shown regularly on the network.

The block Cartoon Planet was revived on Cartoon Network from 2012 to 2014, airing in a format similar to The Cartoon Cartoon Show. It featured Cartoon Cartoons such as Dexter's Laboratory, Johnny Bravo, Cow and Chicken, I Am Weasel, The Powerpuff Girls, Courage the Cowardly Dog, Ed, Edd n Eddy, Codename: Kids Next Door, The Grim Adventures of Billy & Mandy, and other original Cartoon Network Studios series such as Foster's Home for Imaginary Friends, Camp Lazlo, and Chowder.

List of series

Precursor

Full series 

(+) Indicates that the show originally aired as part of Grim & Evil, and that the 2003-2004 episodes were not produced for the standalone show.

In other media 
DC Comics ran an anthology comic based on the Cartoon Cartoon umbrella title, the ongoing series ran from March 2001 to October 2004 for a total of 33 issues.

In the OK K.O.! Let's Be Heroes episode "Crossover Nexus", the Cartoon Cartoon logo is shown in the bottom of a wall inside the Cartoon Network headquarters; the Cartoon Cartoon jingle theme song is played when Ben Tennyson (Ben 10) shape-shifts into different Cartoon Network characters.

See also 
 List of programs broadcast by Cartoon Network
 Nicktoons

Notes

References

External links 
 Fridays at ToonZone.net.

 
Cartoon Network programming blocks
Cartoon Network franchises
Television series by Cartoon Network Studios
Television programming blocks in the United States